Francis Smallman (1565 – 7 September 1633) was an English politician who sat in the House of Commons  in 1621 and 1626.

Smallman was the son of  Francis Smallman and his wife Elizabeth Hopton. He was a lawyer and acquired Kinnersley Castle, serving as High Sheriff of Herefordshire for 1614–15.

In 1621, Smallman was elected Member of Parliament for Leominster. He was elected MP for  Wenlock in 1626. 
 
Smallman married firstly Elizabeth Craft widow of George Craft and daughter of  Stockmede, by whom he had children Francis, Jane, and Jone. He married secondly Susan Clarke, widow of John Clarke of London and daughter of Fabian of Essex by whom he had children William and Alice.

References

1565 births
1633 deaths
People from Leominster
Politicians from Shropshire
Lawyers from Shropshire
English MPs 1621–1622
English MPs 1626
High Sheriffs of Herefordshire